Players and pairs who neither have high enough rankings nor receive wild cards may participate in a qualifying tournament held one week before the annual Wimbledon Tennis Championships.

Seeds

Qualifiers

Lucky losers

Qualifying draw

First qualifier

Second qualifier

Third qualifier

Fourth qualifier

References
 Gentlemen's Doubles Qualifying draw
2017 Wimbledon Championships – Men's draws and results at the International Tennis Federation

Men's Doubles Qualifying
Wimbledon Championship by year – Men's doubles qualifying